Chanesri is a village and deh in Badin taluka of Badin District, Sindh. As of 2017, it has a population of 2,971, in 524 households. It is part of the tapedar circle of Kamaro.

References

Populated places in Badin District